Wamidh Khudhor  (born 1 October 1958) is a former Iraqi football midfielder who played for Iraq at the 1977 FIFA World Youth Championship. 

Khudhor played for Iraq between 1978 and 1981.

References

Iraqi footballers
Iraq international footballers
Living people
Association football midfielders
1958 births